Khorin may refer to:

Aleksandr Khorin (b. 1986), Russian footballer
Khurin (disambiguation), places in Iran